Patricio Pablo Pérez (born 27 June 1985) is an Argentine footballer who plays as midfielder.

Club career

Early career
Pérez began his career at Vélez Sársfield in 2002. In 2005, he moved on loan to Mexican club León, but returned to Argentina shortly afterward. In June 2007 he joined on loan to Chilean side Everton. After another two loans at Chacarita and San Martín de Tucumán respectively, Pérez left Vélez Sársfield and signed permanently for second-tier Defensa y Justicia.

Central Coast Mariners
In June 2010, Pérez signed a 2-year deal with A-League club Central Coast Mariners. Perez made his first start for the club in a pre-season friendly against rivals Melbourne Victory.

His competitive debut came on 28 August in an A-league match against local rivals Sydney FC. His performance was impressive but controversial, with Perez diving and subsequently winning a penalty, as well as getting Sydney FC goalkeeper Liam Reddy sent off. He converted the penalty. Afterwards, he was handed a 2-match ban for simulation by the FFA, and Reddy's sending off was revoked.

On 23 March 2011, Central Coast Mariners agreed to release Perez from the final year of his contract on compassionate grounds. It was revealed by both the player and the club that his exit was due to homesickness.

Honours

Club
Vélez Sársfield
 Torneo Clausura (1): 2005

International
Argentina
 FIFA World Youth Championship (1): 2005

References

External links
 Central Coast Mariners profile
 Patricio Pérez at BDFA.com.ar 
 

Living people
1985 births
Sportspeople from Buenos Aires Province
Argentine footballers
Argentina under-20 international footballers
Argentina youth international footballers
Argentine expatriate footballers
Association football midfielders
Club Atlético Vélez Sarsfield footballers
Club León footballers
Chacarita Juniors footballers
Everton de Viña del Mar footballers
San Martín de Tucumán footballers
Defensa y Justicia footballers
All Boys footballers
Once Caldas footballers
Central Coast Mariners FC players
Boca Unidos footballers
Club Atlético Patronato footballers
Club Comunicaciones footballers
Club Atlético San Miguel footballers
Argentine Primera División players
Primera B Metropolitana players
Primera Nacional players
A-League Men players
Categoría Primera A players
Expatriate footballers in Mexico
Expatriate footballers in Chile
Expatriate footballers in Colombia
Expatriate soccer players in Australia
Argentine expatriate sportspeople in Mexico
Argentine expatriate sportspeople in Chile
Argentine expatriate sportspeople in Colombia
Argentine expatriate sportspeople in Australia